The flag of Umbria is one of the official symbols of the region of Umbria, Italy. The current flag was officially adopted on 18 March 2004, although the emblem and gonfalon had been in use since the 1970s. The Regional Law of 18 May 2004 officially confirmed the flag and added the words Regione Umbria ("Umbria Region") in red, centered in the bottom fifth of the flag, but in common usage, the words are omitted.

History and Symbolism
The flag of Umbria is inspired by a banner designed by architects Gino and Alberto Anselmi, winners of a 1971 competition, who described the symbolism:

The symbol in the flag's center represents the three candles of the Festa dei Ceri, which occurs annually on 15 May in Gubbio, Perugia, in honour of Saint Ubaldo Baldassini.

The coat of arms and flag of the region are officially defined as such:

Gallery

References

Flags of regions of Italy
Umbria
Flags introduced in 2004]